USS Antares may refer to:

, a miscellaneous auxiliary in commission from 1922 to 1946
, ex-SS Nampa Victory, in commission as a cargo ship from 1952 to 1959 and as a general stores issue ship (AKS-33) from 1960 to 1964
, ex-Sea-Land Galloway, ex-USNS Antares (T-AKR-294), a fast sealift ship placed in non-commissioned service in the Military Sealift Command in 1984 and in reserve since 2008

See also
 Antares was the name of the Lunar Module on Apollo 14

United States Navy ship names